Evgeny Donskoy was the defending champion but chose not to defend his title.

Luca Vanni won the title after defeating Illya Marchenko 6–4, 3–6, 6–3 in the final.

Seeds

Draw

Finals

Top half

Bottom half

References
 Main Draw
 Qualifying Draw

Open Castilla y Leon - Singles
2016
2016 Open Castilla y León